Midland City may refer to:

Places in the United States 
Midland City, Alabama
Central Heights-Midland City, Arizona
Midland City, Arizona
Midland City, Illinois

Fiction 
 Midland City, Ohio, the fictional setting of Kurt Vonnegut's novels, including Breakfast of Champions and Deadeye Dick

See also
Midland (disambiguation)